Folias Duo (formerly Folias Flute and Guitar Duo)is an American performer/composer chamber music duo group consisting of flutist Carmen Maret and guitarist Andrew Bergeron. Bergeron and Maret met at Michigan State University while finishing their Master’s Degrees in Music and they were married in 2003. The formation of the duo was brought about by a mutual inspiration for original art music, love of nature and the music of Astor Piazzolla and through their work as Argentine tango dance band leaders.

Bergeron and Maret first played together in 2002 and released their first album Tangos Metamorphoses in 2004 on the Blue Griffin Recording label based in Lansing, MI. The album includes Astor Piazzola’s most famous work for flute and guitar Histoire du Tango. This was followed by Marufo Vega in 2006 which contains their first original composition inspired by tango called Despoblado Suite. In the summer of 2007 they were Artists in Residence on Isle Royale National Park and released the album Waterway in 2008 which contains all original flute and guitar compositions composed about Lake Superior. This was followed by their 2011 release Tango and Snow, an album also with all original flute and guitar compositions that brought together their interest in tango and of nature writing. Viewpoints, the duo's fifth album was released in 2014 and brought together the couple's musical inspirations from ten years of playing and composing together.

Folias Duo has since released two albums on their own Folias Music label, the critically acclaimed Dreaming to Live (2017) and Delicate Omens released in October 2019.

Andrew Bergeron is instructor of guitar and music theory at Grand Rapids Community College, Grand Valley State University and Aquinas College. Andrew is a founding performer and composer with the Grand Rapids Guitar Quartet.

Carmen Maret is an endorsed Pearl Flutes artist and professor of flute at Aquinas College.

Discography

Studio albums
Tangos Metamorphoses (2004) BGR 111
Marufo Vega (2006) BGR 135
Waterway (2008) BGR 175
Tango and Snow (2011) BGR 229
Viewpoints (2014) BGR  341
Dreaming to Live (2017) FM-01
Delicate Omens (2019) FM-02

Other contributions
Latin Dance Project (2010) White Pine Music
Heartside Sketches (2010) Steve Talaga

Compositions
Waves and Waterfalls, Bergeron (2006)Folias Music/ASCAP
Calm to Storm, Bergeron (2006)Folias Music/ASCAP
The Four Seasons of Lake Superior, Bergeron/Maret (2006)Folias Music/ASCAP
High Tide, Bergeron (2007)Folias Music/ASCAP
Fog Break, Bergeron (2007)Folias Music/ASCAP
Walkabout Sparrow, Bergereon/Maret (2007)Folias Music/ASCAP
Gauntlet of Death, Maret (2007)Folias Music/ASCAP
Alpha's Last Dance, Maret (2007)Folias Music/ASCAP
Full Long Nights Moon, Bergeron (2009)Folias Music/ASCAP
Rock Etudes, Maret (2009)Folias Music/ASCAP
Tango and Snow, Bergeron (2010)Folias Music/ASCAP
Algonquin Vals, Bergeron/Maret (2010)Folias Music/ASCAP
Cumparsita Cats, Maret (2010)Folias Music/ASCAP
The Lemon Smugglers, Maret (2010)Folias Music/ASCAP
Adequate Conditions Blues, Maret (2010)Folias Music/ASCAP
Through the Rain, Bergeron (2011)Folias Music/ASCAP
Pajaro Rojo Santo, Maret (2011)Folias Music/ASCAP
Tango Destroyer, Maret (2011)Folias Music/ASCAP
Truffle Oil, Maret (2012)Folias Music/ASCAP
Scotch Bonnet, Bergeron/Maret (2012)Folias Music/ASCAP
Border Trilogy, Bergeron (2013)Folias Music/ASCAP
Mamba Guineé, Maret (2013)Folias Music/ASCAP
Sotres, Bergeron (2013)Folias Music/ASCAP
Buenos Aires Cab Ride, Maret (2013)Folias Music/ASCAP
Cabrales, Bergeron/Maret (2013)Folias Music/ASCAP
Folias Variations, Bergeron (2014)Folias Music/ASCAP
Phoenix Trilogy, Bergeron (2016)Folias Music/ASCAP
Naturaleza Suite, Maret (2016) Folias Music/ASCAP
Impossible Eclipse, Maret (2016) Folias Music/ASCAP
Uncompahgre, Bergeron (2018) Folias Music/ASCAP
Emerson, Bergeron (2018) Folias Music/ASCAP
Creole Ballet, Maret (2019) Folias Music/ASCAP
Angel Forever, Maret (2019) Folias Music/ASCAP

References

External links
Folias Music website
Blue Griffin Recording

Chamber music
Musical groups from Michigan
Tango music groups
2002 establishments in Michigan